Mario Fafangel Jr. /fa'fændʒel/ is a medical doctor who is Slovenia's head epidemiologist as head of the Communicable Diseases Centre at the National Institute of Public Health (NIJZ).  He earned an M.D. from the University of Trieste in 2007. He resigned from Janez Janša's government's COVID-19 advisory group as chief epidemiologist because his evidence-based proposals were not listened to by political members of the group.

Awards
He was awarded the Name of the Year 2020 award by major Slovenian newspaper Delo.

References

Living people
Epidemiologists
1980 births

Slovenian physicians
University of Trieste alumni
Health officials
Slovenian government officials
People in public health